Karl Adamek (23 July 1910 in Vienna – 8 January 2000) was an Austrian international footballer and manager.

External links

Player profile at Austria-Archiv.at 
Manager profile at Austria-Archiv.at 

1910 births
2000 deaths
Austrian footballers
Austria international footballers
FK Austria Wien players
Le Havre AC players
Austrian Football Bundesliga players
Ligue 2 players
Austrian football managers
FC Biel-Bienne managers
FK Austria Wien managers
IFK Norrköping managers
Örgryte IS managers
SK Sturm Graz managers
Hamarkameratene managers
Footballers from Vienna
Association football defenders
Austrian people of Slavic descent
Expatriate footballers in France
Austrian expatriate sportspeople in France
Expatriate football managers in Sweden
Austrian expatriate sportspeople in Sweden
Expatriate football managers in Norway
Austrian expatriate sportspeople in Norway